The Backus-Marblemount Ranger Station House No. 1009 is in Mount Baker-Snoqualmie National Forest, in the U.S. state of Washington. Constructed by the United States Forest Service in 1932, the ranger station was inherited by the National Park Service when North Cascades National Park was dedicated in 1968. The ranger station was placed on the National Register of Historic Places in 1989.

A small portico is at the entrance on the east side and the gable ends are sheathed in board and batten style siding.

References

Park buildings and structures on the National Register of Historic Places in Washington (state)
Buildings and structures completed in 1932
Buildings and structures in Skagit County, Washington
National Register of Historic Places in Skagit County, Washington
Mount Baker-Snoqualmie National Forest